Red Lane is an unincorporated community in Powhatan County, in the U.S. state of Virginia.

References

Unincorporated communities in Virginia
Unincorporated communities in Powhatan County, Virginia